Claude Winter (18 February 1931 in Tianjin (China) – 25 April 2011 in Paris) was a French stage and film actress.

Biography 
She is admitted at the Comédie-Française 1 September 1953, becomes sociétaire on 1 January 1960, then dean 1 January 1987. In 1988, following the death of the administrator (Jean Le Poulain), she is administrator per intérim for two and a half month. When she made the decision to retire, she was named honorary sociétaire by her camarades.

Filmography

Cinema 
1950: Beware of Blondes (by André Hunebelle
1954: Crainquebille (by Ralph Habib) - the lawyer
1973: Les Hommes (by Daniel Vigne)
1984: Le Bon Plaisir (by Francis Girod) - The First Lady
1984: A Sunday in the Country (by Bertrand Tavernier) - Mme. Ladmiral
1992: Savage Nights (by Cyril Collard) - Jean's mother
1993: Couples et Amants (by John Lvoff) - Génia
1994: Délit mineur (by Francis Girod)
1994: L'ange noir (by Jean-Claude Brisseau) - Mrs. Pitot
2010: Rendez-vous avec un ange (by Yves Thomas and Sophie de Daruvar) - the grandmother (final film role)

Television 
1962:  (by Claude Santelli) (L'Auberge de l'ange gardien and Le Général Dourakine) - Madame Blidot
1969:  (Affaire vous concernant) (by Jean-Pierre Conti, TV director Pierre Sabbagh, Théâtre Marigny)
1969: Le Profanateur - Benvenuta
1971: 29 degrés à l'ombre - Mrs. Pomadour
1972: Ruy Blas - the queen
1972: Le Bunker - Eva Braun
1973: Horace - Julie
1975: Ondine - Queen Yseult
1975: Tartuffe - Elmire
1981: Le Pain de ménage - Marthe
1982: Les Caprices de Marianne - Hermia
1989: L'Été de la Révolution (by Lazare Iglesis) - Mrs. Necker
1989: Manon Roland - Manon's mother
1989: Les Grandes Familles - Adèle Schoudler
1995: Maigret - La comtesse de Saint-Fiacre

Theatre 

1953: Un caprice by Alfred de Musset, directed by Maurice Escande, Comédie-Française    
1953: Six Characters in Search of an Author by Luigi Pirandello, directed by Julien Bertheau, Comédie-Française 
1955: Elizabeth, la femme sans homme by André Josset, directed by Henri Rollan, Comédie-Française
1960: Ruy Blas by Victor Hugo, directed by Raymond Rouleau, Comédie-Française 
1962: La Troupe du Roy, hommage to Molière, directed by Paul-Émile Deiber, Comédie-Française
1962: The liar by Corneille, directed by Jacques Charon, Comédie-Française
1965: L'Orphelin de la Chine by Voltaire, directed by Jean Mercure, Comédie-Française
1967: L'Émigré de Brisbane by Georges Schéhadé, directed by Jacques Mauclair, Comédie-Française
1968: Tartuffe by Molière in the part of Elmire, directed by Jacques Charon, Comédie-Française
1968: Athalie by Racine, directed by Maurice Escande, Comédie-Française
1970: Malatesta by Henry de Montherlant, directed by Pierre Dux, Comédie-Française
1970: A Dream Play by August Strindberg, directed by Raymond Rouleau, Comédie-Française
1971: Les Sincères by Marivaux, directed by Jean-Laurent Cochet, Comédie-Française
1971: Ruy Blas by Victor Hugo, directed by Raymond Rouleau, Comédie-Française at the Théâtre de l'Odéon 
1972: Horace by Pierre Corneille, directed by Jean-Pierre Miquel, Comédie-Française
1973: L'Impromptu de Versailles by Molière, directed by Pierre Dux, Comédie-Française 
1973: Hunger and Thirst by Eugène Ionesco, directed by Jean-Marie Serreau, Comédie-Française at the Théâtre de l'Odéon
1973: Tartuffe by Molière, directed by Jacques Charon, Comédie-Française   
1973: C'est la guerre Monsieur Gruber de Jacques Sternberg, directed by Jean-Pierre Miquel, Comédie-Française at the Théâtre de l'Odéon   
1974: Ondine by Jean Giraudoux, directed by Raymond Rouleau, Comédie-Française    
1975: The Idiot by Fiodor Dostoïevski, directed by Michel Vitold, Comédie-Française et the Théâtre Marigny
1976: Cyrano de Bergerac by Edmond Rostand, directed by Jean-Paul Roussillon, Comédie-Française 
1977: Le Cid by Corneille, directed by Terry Hands, Comédie-Française 
1978: Murder in the Cathedral by T. S. Eliot, directed by Terry Hands, Palais de Chaillot
1978: Six Characters in Search of an Author by Luigi Pirandello, directed by Antoine Bourseiller, Comédie-Française
1979: Le Pain de ménage by Jules Renard, directed by Yves Gasc, Comédie-Française
1980: Port-Royal by Henry de Montherlant, directed by Jean Meyer, Comédie-Française
1980: The Seagull by Tchekhov, directed by Otomar Krejča, Comédie-Française 
1980: The Moods of Marianne by Alfred de Musset, mise en scène François Beaulieu, Comédie-Française    
1981: Andromaque by Racine, directed by Patrice Kerbrat, Comédie-Française 
1981: La Dame de chez Maxim by Georges Feydeau, directed by Jean-Paul Roussillon, Comédie-Française
1982: Les Corbeaux de Henry Becque, directed by Jean-Pierre Vincent, Comédie-Française
1984: Cinna by Corneille, directed by Jean-Marie Villégier, Comédie-Française
1984: La Mort de Sénèque by Tristan L'Hermite, directed by Jean-Marie Villégier, Comédie-Française
1985: The Triumph of Love by Marivaux, directed by Alain Halle-Halle, Comédie-Française
1985: Macbeth by Shakespeare, directed by Jean-Pierre Vincent, Comédie-Française
1987: The Eternal Husband by Dostoevsky, directed by Simon Eine, Comédie-Française at the Théâtre de l'Odéon   
1987: A Kind of Alaska by Harold Pinter, directed by Bernard Murat, Comédie-Française at the festival d'Avignon
1988: Death of a Salesman by Arthur Miller, directed by Marcel Bluwal, Théâtre de l'Odéon, Théâtre national de Nice

Dubbing 
 Lady (1st dubbing) :
1955: Lady and the Tramp
 Elizabeth Taylor in : 
1959: Suddenly, Last Summer
1963: Cleopatra 
1954: Janet Leigh in Prince Vaillant 
1954: Lizabeth Scott in Silver Lode 
1956: Linda Cristal in Comanche 
1956: Yvonne De Carlo in The Ten Commandments

Prizes and awards 
 1988 : Prix du Brigadier for Death of a Salesman by Arthur Miller, Centre national de création d'Orléans and Théâtre national de l'Odéon

External links 
 
 Claude Winter à la Comédie-Française
 Claude Winter, reine du Théâtre Français
 Claude Winter on "Les Gens du cinéma"

French stage actresses
French film actresses
Sociétaires of the Comédie-Française
Administrators of the Comédie-Française
Actresses from Tianjin
1931 births
2011 deaths